Sense of Purpose (formerly Nextstep) was an Australian hardcore punk band from Melbourne, active from 1996 to 2006.

Career

The band played under the name Nextstep between 1996 and 1999, releasing a demo tape "Together We Can Make a Difference" and a 7-inch EP "Time to Speak Up". They released their first full-length CD as Sense of Purpose, A Matter of Respect, in February 2001, along with the previously unreleased EP "End of a New Beginning", recorded in December 1998.

In 2003, the band's drummer became a second vocalist, and Grant Johns of Dying Breed was brought in to play drums.

In February 2004, the band returned to Birdland Studios to record their second full-length CD, Tomorrow's Too Late, which was released in mid-2004. The band signed with UK hardcore label Go-Team Records, who released the album internationally later that year. Shortly afterwards the band's guitarist Leith Gow left to form In Name And Blood, and was replaced by new guitarist Brad O'Gorman, previously from British band Insight.

In 2006, Sense of Purpose released their final CD, Dismantled, and played their final show alongside the Dead Walk, INAB, Procedure 286 and Go For Broke. During their existence Sense of Purpose supported a number of touring bands including: Agnostic Front (US), H2O (US), AFI (US), Cro-Mags (US), Terror (US), Ensign (US), No Fun at All (Sweden), Strife (US), Champion (US), Citizen Fish (UK), Agent Orange (US), Good Clean Fun (US), Strike Anywhere (US), Dayglo Abortions (Can) and Vitamin X (Neth).

Discography
Dismantled - 7 Song CD (Jan 2006)
Tomorrow's Too Late - 11 song CD (April 2004)
A Matter of Respect - 10 song CD (Feb 2001)
End of a New Beginning - 5 song CD (Feb 2001)
As Nextstep
Time to Speak Up - 6 song 7-inch E.P. (Jan 1998)
We Can Make a Difference - 7 song Demo Tape (Jan 1997)
Compilation: "True Till Death" 
Compilation: "Call It Whatever You Want 2" 
Compilation: "So This Is Jeff's Victoria" 
Compilation: "Punk O' Clock" 
Compilation: "Promotional Use Only"

External links
Sense of Purpose website
Go-Team Records website

Australian hardcore punk groups